Railroad Acquisition Holdings, LLC (RAH) is a railroad holding company which owns several railroads in the U.S. states of Florida, Maine, and Vermont, as well as the Canadian province of Quebec.

RAH was formed on December 10, 2013, and is a wholly owned subsidiary of Fortress Investment Group incorporated in Wilmington, Delaware.

Subsidiaries
RAH owns the following subsidiaries:

 Florida East Coast Railway  which operates between Jacksonville and Miami, Florida.

References 

United States railroad holding companies
Canadian railroad holding companies
Companies based in Wilmington, Delaware
2013 establishments in Delaware